Nihil obstat (Latin for "nothing hinders" or "nothing stands in the way") is a declaration of no objection that warrants censoring of a book, e.g., Catholic published books, to an initiative, or an appointment.

Publishing 

The phrase nihil obstat is used by a cleric, of the Catholic Church, known as a Censor Librorum, to indicate that a book contains nothing contrary to Catholic doctrines, faith, or morals. Canon law requires this approval for the publication of books by faithful Catholics if they "touch upon matters of faith and morals", and requires that pastors enforce this rule. The Censor librorum (Latin for "censor of books") is delegated by a bishop of the Catholic Church. The Censor Librorum  reviews the text in question, a process that in the modern era is roughly two months long. If an author is a member of a religious institute (such as a monastery), and if the book concerns religion or morals, then canon law requires obtaining the imprimi potest ("it can be printed") of the major superior before publication. The bishop of the author's diocese or of the place of publication (such as a publishing company) gives the final approval by the declaration known as the imprimatur ("let it be printed").

Marriage 

A nihil obstat also refers the document declaring that someone is free to marry due to lack of form in the previous marriage. It can also refer to a document of dispensation from certain impediments to marriage in the Catholic Church.

See also 
 Imprimi permittitur
 Index Librorum Prohibitorum

References

External links
 Code of Canon Law, The Means of Social Communication and Books in Particular (canons 822-832)
 A Word A Day: nihil obstat

Catholic theology and doctrine
Latin religious words and phrases
Censorship in Christianity